The 1915 State of the Union Address was given by Woodrow Wilson, the 28th president of the United States on Tuesday, December 7, 1915.  It was given to a joint session of the 64th United States Congress, to the United States Senate and United States House of Representatives.  It was given shortly before the United States entered World War I.  He said these words: "The moral is, that the states of America are not hostile rivals but cooperating friends, and that their growing sense of community or interest, alike in matters political and in matters economic, is likely to give them a new significance as factors in international affairs and in the political history of the world."

References

Presidency of Woodrow Wilson
Speeches by Woodrow Wilson
State of the Union addresses
64th United States Congress
State of the Union Address
State of the Union Address
State of the Union Address
State of the Union Address
December 1915 events